Aathma is the fifth studio album by Andorran metal band Persefone. It was released on 24 February 2017 by label ViciSolum Productions.

Track listing

Personnel 
Source:

Persefone

 Marc Martins: vocals
 Carlos Lozano: guitars
 Miguel Espinosa: keyboards, vocals
 Tony Mestre: bass
 Sergi Verdeguer: drums
 Filipe Baldaia: guitars

Guest musicians

 Paul Masvidal (Cynic, Death): narration (track 1), guitars and vocals (track 7)
 Øystein Landsverk (Leprous): guitars (track 10, part 3)
 Merethe Soltvedt (Two Steps from Hell): vocals (track 10, parts 2 and 4)

Production

 Mixed and mastered by Jens Bogren (Katatonia, Opeth, Devin Townsend, Arch Enemy, Symphony X)
 Artwork by Travis Smith (Death, Nevermore, King Diamond, Anathema)
 Drums edited by Teddy Möller (Loch Vostok)
 Produced by Carlos Lozano Quintanilla, Moe Espinosa and Sergi Verdeguer

References

External links 
 Review in The Moshville Times

2017 albums
Persefone albums